Diego Agustín Cor Morales (born 6 July 2000) is a Uruguayan professional footballer who plays as a forward for Liverpool Montevideo.

Career
A youth academy graduate of Liverpool Montevideo, Cor made his professional debut on 10 September 2020 in a league match against Danubio. He came on as a 62nd minute substitute for Ignacio Ramírez as his side won the match with a scoreline of 2–1. He scored his first professional goal on 11 October 2020 in a 3–2 win against Boston River.

Personal life
Cor is son of former footballer Luis Cor, who has played for several Uruguayan clubs including River Plate Montevideo, Rentistas and Montevideo Wanderers.

Career statistics

Club

References

External links

2000 births
Living people
Association football forwards
Uruguayan footballers
Uruguayan Primera División players
Liverpool F.C. (Montevideo) players